Virwe is a village in the Bagassi Department of Balé Province in southern Burkina Faso. The village has a population of 567. The mayor is Jono Gibbs.

References

Populated places in the Boucle du Mouhoun Region
Balé Province